, better known as , was a Japanese singer and actor. He is known for both his work with Flower Travellin' Band and as a solo musician; singing at a vocal range of three octaves. As an actor, he appeared in many television shows and movies, such as Takashi Miike's Deadly Outlaw: Rekka and the 1989 version of Zatoichi.

He is also recognized for 20 years of charity and volunteer work with the Japan International Cooperation Agency and flew around the world helping those in poor or war-torn conditions; visiting more than 30 countries including Afghanistan, Myanmar, Bosnia, numerous sovereign states in Africa, China, Ukraine (including Chernobyl), North Korea, Vietnam, Iraq, and Brazil. While doing aid work in Jamaica, he met local musicians and later became involved in reggae music. His aid work was a personal inspiration to help those who were growing up in similar conditions that he had experienced as a child.

Biography
Akira Yamanaka was born in Yokohama, Japan, on September 2, 1946. He grew up in a family of seven children, though the only one of mixed descent as his father was a US Army soldier of Caribbean descent. In his autobiography, he mentions that he never met his biological father and that he came from a poor family in ruined Yokohama; being born in a brothel as his mother was a prostitute for the Recreation and Amusement Association. The only knowledge of his father was that he was a US soldier from either Cuba or Jamaica. Joe grew up in an orphanage after his mother and stepfather died. During an interview with Mainichi Shimbun, Akira stated that he was born with tuberculosis and that he never really thought about his biological father, believing that those who raised him were his real parents.

He left the orphanage at the age of 16 and became a boxer (inspired by his childhood idol Hiroyuki Ebihara) to earn money, he then met his lifelong friend Rikiya Yasuoka, who was a kickboxer of Japanese-Sicilian heritage. Yamanaka mentions that he adopted the English name Joe because it is the English pronunciation of his favorite painter, Keito Joh; with Joh meaning castle in Japanese. As a teenage boxer, he used the ring name . Joe and Rikiya decided to become actors and starred in the 1964 Japanese film Bicycle Thieves. Yamanaka's career changed once again, though he would continue to act until his death, when he met another lifelong friend, Johnny Yoshinaga, who persuaded him to become a musician. In 1966, he became a member of the group sounds band 4.9.1. Four years later, while in the blues band Mystic Morning with Hideki Ishima, the two of them were scouted by Yuya Uchida for Flower Travellin' Band. They went on to become successful, particularly in Canada where they lived for a while, and are now considered a pioneering and influential Japanese band.

In his acting career he was known as one of the three "real tough guys" in Japanese cinema, along with Tsunehiko Watase and Jerry Fujio. The trio were known for being good-natured, but with a rebellious past and noted fighting prowess. In his autobiography, Akira recounts the times during his youth when he was involved in violent fights. After a large brawl with members of the Zenkyoto in Hibiya Park in which he almost killed a man, the resulting police raid led him to an epiphany that "violence leads to nothing." Yamanaka starred as himself in the Hollywood action movie Ulterior Motives featuring Thomas Ian Griffith and Ellen Crawford. Three of Joe's songs were used in the film.

After Flower Travellin' Band disbanded in 1973, Joe started a solo career the following year. It is the theme song and namesake of the 1977 film Proof of the Man, which is based on a novel by Seiichi Morimura about war babies. Joe also has a small acting role in the film as a half Japanese, half African-American who is murdered, which the film is based around. In Chinese speaking countries the song is called "Old Straw Hat", taken from lyrics in the song. That same year, he was arrested on suspicion of violating the Cannabis Control Law.

He was close friends with numerous celebrities including Mickey Curtis and Yoko Ono. Joe recorded the entrance theme for Shinji Takehara titled "Hot Vibration" and composed the song  with his friend Amália Rodrigues. He later became the lead singer of The Wailers for around five years after his friend Bob Marley died.

In 2007, Flower Travellin' Band reunited and released an album the following year. They performed several concerts, including internationally in the US and Canada.

Death 
In March 2010, it was announced that Joe was diagnosed with lung cancer, which he learned in February. On September 6, his house was burned down after a lit cigarette was left unattended . In March of the following year Yamanaka participated in fundraising for relief from the 2011 Tōhoku earthquake and tsunami, and performed his last concert on May 5. He suffered cardiac arrest in late July. Joe died from his cancer on August 7, 2011 at 6:56 am, less than a month before his 65th birthday.

Discography

Solo 
Studio
 1974 – JOE (Rereleased in 1978)
 1977 – 新しい世界へ – TO THE NEW WORLD
 1979 – GOIN' HOME
 1981 – 魂
 1991 – LOVE IS AN ART
 2006 – Mr. Rally – stupid philosopher
 2009 – Reggae Vibration IV
Compilation

 1980 – Joe '70s
 1986 – 20th ANNIVERSARY
 1996 – ３オクターブの証明
 1999 – REGGAE HISTORY
 2001 – W's
 2005 – 究極のベスト！　ジョー山中

Live

 1978 – 武道館ライブ

With Flower Travellin' Band 
Studio

 1970 – Anywhere
 1971 – Satori
 1972 – Made in Japan
 1973 – Make Up
 2008 – We Are Here

Compilation

 1971 – Satori

 1975 – The Times

Video

 2008 – Resurrection

With Kuni Kawachi 

 1970 – Kirikyogen

With The Wailers 

1982 – Reggae Vibration
 1983 – Reggae Vibration II
 1984 – Reggae Vibration III

With Akira Ito and Hideki Ishima 

 1984 – Japanesque

Filmography
 1964 – Car Thieves
 1968 – Blackmail Is My Life
 1969 – Black Rose Mansion
 1977 – Proof of the Man
 1989 – Zatoichi: Darkness Is His Ally
 2002 – Deadly Outlaw: Rekka
 2003 – Shin Karate Baka Ichidai: Kakutōsha
 2004 – Izo

References

External links

1946 births
2011 deaths
20th-century Japanese musicians
20th-century Japanese male singers
20th-century Japanese singers
Deaths from lung cancer in Japan
English-language singers from Japan
Japan International Cooperation Agency
Japanese male film actors
Japanese male television actors
Japanese male rock singers
Japanese people of African-American descent
Japanese people of Caribbean descent
Japanese reggae musicians
Musicians from Kanagawa Prefecture
Musicians from Yokohama
Singers with a three-octave vocal range